Solonovka is a rural locality (a selo) in Solonovsky Selsoviet, Novichikhinsky District, Altai Krai, Russia. The population was 776 as of 2013. There are 9 streets.

Geography 
Solonovka is located on the Priobskoye plato, 42 km south of Novichikha (the district's administrative centre) by road. 10 let Oktyabrya is the nearest rural locality.

References 

Rural localities in Novichikhinsky District